Chukwunonso Nduka "BeeJay" Anya (born March 9, 1995) is an American basketball player. He played college basketball for the NC State Wolfpack. He was named Atlantic Coast Conference Sixth Man of the Year in 2015. Anya represented the United States youth team at the 2012 FIBA Under-17 World Championship, winning the gold medal.

College career 
Anya played college basketball for NC State where he was best known for his shot blocking ability. During his sophomore season in a game against Jacksonville, he set the NC State school record for blocks in a single game with 10.  In setting the record, Anya at one point recorded 4 blocks in a single possession. His 91 blocks during the 2014–2015 season put him second on the NC State single season blocks list, behind Thurl Bailey's 95 blocks  in 1983. Anya entered the 2015–2016 season in 5th place on NC State's career blocks list with 137 career blocks. He finished his career with the Wolfpack in 2017 with 243 career blocked shots, a school record.

Anya also holds the record for longest wingspan recorded for a non-7-foot player in the NBA Draft Express database for basketball prospects, with a wingspan of 7 ft 9 in.

Professional career 
In January 2020, Anya signed with TLN Kalev of the Latvian-Estonian Basketball League where he appeared in two games. In January 2021, Anya signed with Torta del Casar Extremadura of the Spanish Liga EBA where he appeared in one game.

Personal 
Anya is of Nigerian descent, his father Ben Anya having played soccer while growing up. His sister Stephanie competed as a basketball center for American University.

References

External links
NC State Wolfpack bio
USA Basketball bio

1995 births
Living people
Basketball players from Maryland
Centers (basketball)
DeMatha Catholic High School alumni
NC State Wolfpack men's basketball players
People from Cheverly, Maryland
Power forwards (basketball)
American people of Nigerian descent
American men's basketball players